Peter Giftopoulos (born June 14, 1965) is a former Canadian football linebacker who played eight years for the Hamilton Tiger-Cats of the Canadian Football League (CFL). Giftopoulos played college football at Penn State.

College career
After playing on the defensive line at Cathedral High School in Hamilton, Ontario, Giftopoulos committed to play college football at Penn State as a linebacker. He chose Penn State over Michigan, Notre Dame and Syracuse. After starting his freshman season on the defensive line, Giftopoulos was shifted to tight end. He was later moved to linebacker and gained a starting role before his junior season, earning the spot over Mike Beckish.
 
Giftopoulos recorded a sack and two interceptions, including the game-sealing pick in the 1987 Fiesta Bowl. During the following spring, he broke his tibia after a teammate fell on it in practice, and a knee injury derailed his senior season.

Professional career

Pittsburgh Steelers
After not being selected in the 1988 NFL Draft, Giftopoulos signed with the Pittsburgh Steelers on May 11, 1988. He was released by the Steelers on August 23.

Saskatchewan Roughriders
The Saskatchewan Roughriders selected Giftopoulos with the sixth overall pick in the 1988 CFL entry draft. After being cut by the Steelers, Giftopoulos refused to report to practice and asked for a trade.

Hamilton Tiger-Cats
The Hamilton Tiger-Cats traded for Giftopoulos and a second-round draft selection in exchange for two other players. He initially spent time at linebacker, but then moved to defensive line, then offensive line, then back to linebacker.

Personal life
Pete's father Paul Giftopoulos was a professional soccer player in Greece before immigrating to Canada. Two of Pete's brothers also played college football. Pete also played basketball and soccer in high school and threw shot put.

After his playing career finishes, Giftopoulos became a restaurant entrepreneur in Hamilton and later returned to Penn State for kinesiology classes. He married and had children.

References

Living people
1965 births
Sportspeople from Hamilton, Ontario
Canadian people of Greek descent
American football linebackers
American football tight ends
Canadian football linebackers
Canadian football defensive linemen
Canadian football offensive linemen
Penn State Nittany Lions football players
Players of Canadian football from Ontario
Pittsburgh Steelers players
Hamilton Tiger-Cats players